Donemana or Dunnamanagh (named after the townland of Dunnamanagh) is a small village in County Tyrone, Northern Ireland. It is 7 miles or 11 kilometres north-east of Strabane, on the banks of the Burn Dennett and at the foothills of the Sperrins. It is the largest of the thirteen villages in the Strabane District Council area and had a population of 586 in the 2001 Census.

Other anglicised spellings of its name include Dun[n]amana[gh] and Don[n]amana[gh].

History
The village was established in the early 17th century as part of the Plantation of Ulster, instigated by James I in 1609. Land in the area was granted to John Drummond who established the village; building a bawn (an enclosed, fortified farmyard, designed as a place of refuge for settlers in case of attack), 10 wicker-work houses, and a watermill for grinding corn.

Transport
Donemana railway station was part of the County Donegal Railway and opened on 6 August 1900 but was shut on 1 January 1955.

Education
It has two primary schools, Donemana County Primary School and St. Patrick's Primary School. Local children generally attend secondary school in Strabane or Derry.

Sport
Today the village is renowned throughout Ireland for its thriving and highly successful cricket team, which was established in 1888. Donemana under 15s and 14s cricket teams are currently the All-Ireland Champions. The senior team lost out on winning the All-Ireland when North County CC defeated them in the final.

Football is also popular in the area. Clann na nGael is the local GAA club.

Notable people
Notable people who were born or have lived in Donemana include:
George Fletcher Moore, 19th century writer, barrister and explorer
Allan Bresland, politician
William Porterfield, Irish cricketer
Andrew McBrine, Irish cricketer
Stephen O'Neill, Tyrone All-Ireland-winning GAA 
Brian Dooher, Tyrone All-Ireland-winning GAA captain

Demography

19th century population
The population of the village increased during the 19th century:

The village stands in the townlands of Dunnamanagh and Stonyfalls, and in 1891, had an estimated area of 11 acres.

21st century population
Donemana is classified as a small village or hamlet by the Northern Ireland Statistics and Research Agency (NISRA) (i.e. with population between 500 and 1,000). On Census day (27 March 2011) there were 586 people living in Donemana. Of these:
23.21% were aged under 16 and 13.14% were aged 65 and over
48.46% of the population were male and 51.54% were female
15.19% were from a Catholic background and 83.79% were from a Protestant background
7.8% of people aged 16–74 were unemployed.

Dunnamanagh Townland
The townland is situated in the historic barony of Strabane Lower and the civil parish of Donaghedy and covers an area of 130 acres.

The population of the townland increased overall during the 19th century:

See also
List of townlands of County Tyrone

References

External links

Donemana and its Environs - Strabane District Council website

Villages in County Tyrone
Townlands of County Tyrone
Barony of Strabane Lower